The nuchal fascia is a fascia covering the autochthonous musculature of the neck as a part of the cervical fascia. It proceeds the thoracolumbar  fascia to the top (cranial). The fascia itself is made of two parts: A superficial layer (lat.: Fascia nuchae superficialis) and a deeper layer that is located among the Trapezius muscle and that sheaths the deeper cervical musculature from dorsal side. Expanding laterally, the fascia also covers the dorsal musculature.  In the middle of the deeper layer a bulge is resided – the nuchal ligament.

Sources

References

Literature 
 
 

Fascia